Silverwood may refer to:

Places

Australia 

 Silverwood, Queensland, a locality in the Southern Downs Region

Canada 

 Silverwood Heights, Saskatoon, Saskatchewan, a neighborhood
 Rural Municipality of Silverwood No. 123, Saskatchewan
 Fredericton-Silverwood, a provincial electoral district in New Brunswick

United Kingdom 

Silverwood, Ayrshire, a farm, previously a small country estate.
Silverwood, County Armagh, a townland in County Armagh, Northern Ireland

United States 

 Silverwood, Indiana, an unincorporated community
 Silverwood, Michigan
 Silverwood Lake, a reservoir in San Bernardino County, California
 Silverwood Theme Park, an amusement park in northern Idaho

People with the surname
Chris Silverwood, English cricketer
Richard Silverwood (born 1976), English rugby league referee

Other uses
 Silverwood Colliery, Yorkshire, England
 Silverwood Dairy, an Ontario dairy company
 Silverwood School, a special school in Wiltshire, England